Lactarius hatsudake, also known as red milk mushroom, is a species of agaric fungus in the family Russulaceae native to Asia, first described by  in 1890. It is a sought-after choice edible in several Asian countries, with attempts of cultivation in mycorrhizal symbiosis being made.

Distribution and ecology 
Lactarius hatsudake is widely distributed in Southeast Asia, including China, Japan, Bonin Islands, eastern Russia and Korea. It is ectomycorrhizal with Pinus species, such as Pinus thunbergii, Pinus densiflora, Pinus luchuensis, Pinus yunnanensis, and Pinus kesiya.

References

External links 
 

hatsudake
Fungi of Asia
Fungi described in 1890